Serghei Ivanovich Rogaciov (born 20 May 1977) is a Moldovan football coach and a former player who played as a forward.

Career
He previously played for Constructorul Chişinău, FC Sheriff Tiraspol, FC Olimpia Bălţi, and Cristalul Făleşti, Saturn Ramenskoye, FC Aktobe and FC Ural Sverdlovsk Oblast.

International
He played 9 games in 2006 FIFA World Cup qualification (UEFA) and 6 games in UEFA Euro 2008 qualifying.

International goals
Scores and results list Moldova's goal tally first.

Other Fact

Serghei Rogaciov was one of the 11 Moldovan football players challenged and beaten by Tony Hawks and features in his book Playing the Moldovans at Tennis.

References

External links

 

1977 births
People from Glodeni District
Living people
Moldovan footballers
Association football forwards
Moldovan expatriate footballers
Moldova international footballers
CSF Bălți players
Moldovan Super Liga players
FC Tiraspol players
FC Sheriff Tiraspol players
FC Saturn Ramenskoye players
Expatriate footballers in Russia
Expatriate footballers in Kazakhstan
Moldovan expatriate sportspeople in Kazakhstan
FC Aktobe players
FC Ural Yekaterinburg players
FC Vostok players
FC Dynamo Saint Petersburg players
Russian Premier League players
Kazakhstan Premier League players
Moldovan football managers
CSF Bălți managers
Moldovan Super Liga managers